Ernest "Ernie" Ingenito (May 27, 1924 – October 7, 1995) was an American spree killer who shot nine people, his wife Theresa Mazzoli and her family, killing five and injuring four, on November 17, 1950, in Franklin Township and Minotola, New Jersey.

Early life
Ingenito was born in Wildwood, New Jersey, on May 27, 1924, to Ernest and his wife, Helen (née Martin) Ingenito. He was the oldest of three children. The family moved frequently between Wildwood and Philadelphia, and his parents finally separated when he was thirteen.  Ingenito first got in trouble for stealing when he was ten and was first sent to a reformatory at fourteen. He continued to go in and out of reformatories for the next few years until he was paroled and allowed to return to Wildwood to live with his mother.

At age 17, Ingenito married 16-year-old Doris Breslin. Breslin became pregnant soon after and later gave birth to the couple's first child, a daughter, Dorothy. During the marriage, Ingenito was reportedly abusive towards his wife. Two years into the marriage, Ingenito was drafted to serve in the US Army; during World War II, he was stationed at Fort Belvoir in Virginia. He was dishonorably discharged in 1946 after being court-martialed twice: once for going AWOL (Ingenito left without permission after hearing that his wife was living with another man), and a second for striking two superior officers.  He served two years of an eight-year sentence at Green Haven Correctional Facility, the military prison at Sing Sing, for the second offense.

Ingenito and Doris were later divorced.

Marriage to Theresa Mazzoli
Shortly after his discharge, Ingenito married 21-year-old Theresa Mazzoli, the daughter of Michael and Pearl Mazzoli, who owned a truck farm on Piney Hollow Road in Franklin Township, Gloucester County, New Jersey. Theresa convinced Ingenito to move in with her family and the young couple initially appeared to have had a happy marriage. Ingenito worked on the farm and they had two sons. While Ingenito got along well with his father-in-law, Michael, he did not like his mother-in-law, Pearl.

The relationship between Ingenito and his wife and her family rapidly deteriorated after he took an outside job at a local appliance store. When Michael came to believe that his son-in-law was seeing other women, he threw Ingenito out of the house. Ingenito moved a few miles away to board with Al and Kay Rulis, friends of his father. As Theresa proceeded with plans for a divorce, Ingenito reportedly contacted lawyers about seeing his children. In the meantime, he had taken up target shooting and began buying ammunition at local stores for his growing gun collection.

Killings
At about 8 p.m. on November 17, 1950, Ingenito armed himself with a Luger, a Mauser C96, and a .32 caliber rifle and drove to the Mazzoli house. He confronted Theresa and demanded to see their children; when Michael intervened, Ingenito shot him twice, killing him. As Theresa fled into the adjacent dining room, Ingenito shot her in the stomach and shoulder.

When his mother-in-law Pearl fled across the street to her parents’ home, Ingenito followed. He shot her mother, Theresa Pioppi, in the doorway, then stepped over her body to shoot and kill his wife's pregnant aunt, Marion Pioppi. He wounded his wife's nine-year-old cousin, Jeannie, then shot and killed Pearl Mazzoli, who tried to hide in a closet. Ingenito also killed John Pioppi, one of Pearl's brothers, who had chased after Ingenito with a knife.

Ingenito continued his killing spree, driving to Minotola, where Theresa's aunt and uncle, Frank and Hilda Mazzoli, lived. He shot both of them in front of their two younger children. Although critically wounded, both survived. Ingenito was arrested by the New Jersey State Police. Although he confessed to the killings during questioning, he later refused to sign a statement admitting his guilt.

Sentencing
Ingenito was initially sentenced to life imprisonment for the murder of Pearl Mazzoli. His lawyer, Frank Sahl, was able to persuade the jury that they did not want the responsibility of sending him to the electric chair. While all four counts of assault were dismissed, five years passed before he was brought to court on the four additional murder charges. Although his attorneys initially planned to plead that he was not guilty by reason of insanity, they later changed that plea to one of "no contest" on all four counts. The judge allowed him to serve all five sentences concurrently.

Later years and death
Since New Jersey did not have a life sentence without possibility of parole at the time, Ingenito was released in 1974 and lived in Trenton, where he worked for Trap Rock Industries.

In 1994, Ingenito was arrested again, this time for sexual assault of the daughter of his girlfriend. Ingenito was found guilty on 29 counts of sexual assault which took place over the span of six years, and sentenced to 50 years in prison. He died in prison of heart failure on October 7, 1995.

See also 
 Crime in New Jersey
 Gun violence in the United States
 Howard Unruh, another New Jersey-based spree killer
 List of rampage killers
 Mass shootings in the United States

Footnotes

References 
Blackwell, John. Notorious New Jersey: 100 True Tales of Murders and Mobsters, Scandals and Scoundrels. Rutgers University Press: Piscataway, 2007. pp. 69–71 (paperback edition).
Martinelli, Patricia A. Rain of Bullets: The True Story of Ernest Ingenito's Bloody Family Massacre, Stackpole Books: Mechanicsburg, PA, 2010.
Nash, Jay Robert. Bloodletters and Badmen: A Narrative Encyclopedia of American Criminals From the Pilgrims to the Present. M. Evans and Company: New York, 1973. pp. 261–263. (Note: Nash miscounts the number of victims as eight.)

External links
Ernest Ingenito at Find a Grave

1924 births
1995 deaths
1950 murders in the United States
American people convicted of murder
American people convicted of sexual assault
American mass murderers
American people who died in prison custody
American spree killers
People convicted of murder by New Jersey
People from Wildwood, New Jersey
People paroled from life sentence
Prisoners sentenced to life imprisonment by New Jersey
Prisoners who died in New Jersey detention
United States Army personnel of World War II
United States Army personnel who were court-martialed
Prisoners and detainees of the United States military
Massacres in 1950
Massacres in the United States